Sam Verrills (born 13 January 1999) is an Australian professional rugby league footballer who plays as a  for the Gold Coast Titans in the NRL.

Verrills previously played for the Sydney Roosters with whom he won the 2019 NRL Grand Final, scoring the opening try of the match.

Early life
Verrills was born in Sydney, Australia and was educated at Barrenjoey High School, Avalon.

Verrills played his junior rugby league for Avalon Bulldogs.

Career
Verrills made his NRL debut in round 6 of the 2019 NRL season for the Sydney Roosters against the Melbourne Storm at AAMI Park.
In Round 20 against the Gold Coast, Verrills scored his first try in the top grade as the Roosters won the match 58–6 at the Sydney Cricket Ground.

In his debut year Verrills won his first premiership with the Roosters against the Canberra Raiders. Verrills scored the opening try after 6 minutes and the match was eventually won by Sydney, 14–8, making them the first club in 26 years to have won consecutive premierships in a unified competition, and the first time the club has won consecutive titles since 1974 and 1975.

In round 7 of the 2020 NRL season, Verrills was taken from the field with an ACL injury.
In December, Verrills signed a contract extension keeping him at the Sydney Roosters until the end of 2024.

In the 2021 NRL season, after coming back from the injury, he then suffered a detached retina keeping him on the sidelines for multiple weeks.  Verrills played a total of 14 games for the Roosters in the 2021 including the club's opening finals game against the Gold Coast. The Sydney would be eliminated from the second week of the finals losing to Manly 42-6.

On 10 August 2022, Verrills signed a two-year deal to join the Gold Coast.In round 22 of the 2022 NRL season, Verrills scored two tries for the Sydney Roosters in a 32-18 victory over North Queensland.

References

External links
Roosters profile

Australian rugby league players
Sydney Roosters players
Gold Coast Titans players
Rugby league hookers
Living people
Rugby league players from Sydney
North Sydney Bears NSW Cup players
1999 births